The 2018–19 Villanova Wildcats men's basketball team represented Villanova University in the 2018–19 NCAA Division I men's basketball season. Led by head coach Jay Wright in his 18th year, the Wildcats played their home games at the Finneran Pavilion on the school's campus in the Philadelphia suburb of Villanova, Pennsylvania and Wells Fargo Center as members of the Big East Conference. They finished the season 26–10, 13–5 in Big East play to finish in first place. They defeated Providence, Xavier, and Seton Hall to win the Big East tournament. As a result, the Wildcats received the conference's automatic bid to the NCAA tournament as the No. 6 seed in the South region. There they defeated Saint Mary's before being defeated by Purdue in the Second Round.

Previous season
The Wildcats finished the 2017–18 season 36–4, 14–4 in Big East play to finish in second place. They defeated Marquette, Butler, and Providence to win the Big East tournament championship. As a result, they received the conference's automatic bid to the NCAA tournament as the No. 1 seed in the East region, their third No. 1 seed in four years. They defeated Radford, Alabama, West Virginia, and Texas Tech to advance to the Final Four for the second time in three years. In the National Semifinal, they defeated Kansas before defeating Michigan in the National Championship game to win their second national championship in three years. They won every game of the tournament by a double-digit margin and the team's tournament run has been called among the most dominant ever.

Offseason

Coaching changes
Following the season, longtime assistant coach Ashley Howard left the Wildcats to become the head coach at La Salle.

Departures

Incoming transfers

2018 recruiting class

2019 Recruiting class

Roster

Schedule and results

|-
!colspan=12 style=|Non-conference regular season

|-
!colspan=12 style=| Big East regular season

|-
!colspan=9 style=|Big East tournament

|-
!colspan=9 style=|NCAA tournament

Source

Rankings

*AP does not release post-NCAA Tournament rankings^Coaches did not release a Week 1 poll.

References

Villanova
Villanova Wildcats men's basketball seasons
Villanova
Villanova
Villanova